Things That Play Themselves is the second studio album by noise rock band King Snake Roost, released in 1989 by Aberrant Records.

Release and reception 
Critic David Sprague of the Trouser Press called the record a "feverish disc" that warrants comparison to early Pere Ubu.

In 1989, the album was adopted by Amphetamine Reptile Records and re-issued on vinyl.

Track listing

Personnel 
Adapted from the Things That Play Themselves liner notes.

King Snake Roost
 Bill Bostle – drums
 Peter Hill – lead vocals, guitar, trombone, harp
 David Quinn – bass guitar, backing vocals, illustration
 Charles Tolnay – guitar, bass guitar

Additional musicians
 Adrian Hornblower III – saxophone (A2, B1)
 Lachlan McLeod – guitar (A2)
 Tom Sturm – trumpet (A2)
Additional musicians and production
 Caroline Birkett – design, illustration
 Dave Boyne – production, engineering, piano (A4), guitar (B1)

Release history

References

External links 
 

1989 albums
Amphetamine Reptile Records albums
King Snake Roost albums